Ophelia is a 2018 historical romantic drama film directed by Claire McCarthy and written by Semi Chellas about the character of the same name from William Shakespeare's play Hamlet. Based on the novel by Lisa Klein, the film follows the story of Hamlet from Ophelia's perspective. It stars Daisy Ridley in the title role, alongside Naomi Watts, Clive Owen, George MacKay, Tom Felton and Devon Terrell. The dialogue is in modern English.

The film premiered at the 2018 Sundance Film Festival, and had a limited theatrical run on June 28, 2019, followed by a VOD release on July 2, 2019 by IFC Films. Critical reception was mixed, though Ridley's performance received acclaim.

Plot
In the castle of Elsinore, Denmark, the wilful and free-spirited Ophelia is Queen Gertrude's  favourite lady-in-waiting, though she is ridiculed by the other ladies for her lack of nobility. Her father, Polonius, serves as chief councillor to King Hamlet.
Upon his return from Wittenberg, Prince Hamlet soon begins courting Ophelia, but their blossoming romance is cut short when Hamlet returns to Wittenberg to continue his studies. At the same time, Hamlet's uncle Claudius begins to seduce Gertrude.

Later, Gertrude charges Ophelia with retrieving a tonic from a healer named Mechtild who lives deep in the forest. While preparing the queen's chambers for the night, she witnesses the king and queen in a heated argument. Ophelia pursues the distraught Gertrude up to the castle parapets where she encounters what appears to be a ghost.
The next day the king is found dead, presumably from a venomous snake bite. Claudius takes the throne as his successor and marries Gertrude. Hamlet returns to Elsinore in a rage, having heard the news from Polonius, and begins to suspect foul play. He resumes his romance with Ophelia, which the court begins to notice. Ophelia's brother Laertes cautions her to be wary of his advances, before leaving for France. At the advice of his trusted friend, Horatio, Ophelia meets Hamlet at the parapets where he confides in her his suspicions about his mother's infidelity.

The next day while on another errand for the queen, Ophelia encounters the same spectral figure from the parapets. Mechtild is revealed to be not only Gertrude's twin sister but also Claudius' former lover, who brought her to ruin after he accused her of witchcraft when she miscarried their illegitimate son. Mechtild was able to escape persecution by faking her death by drinking a special poison. Later on, Hamlet meets Ophelia in the chapel and the couple marry in secret.

While attending to the queen early the next morning, Ophelia discovers the spectral figure that she encountered earlier is actually Claudius. She finds Mechtild's poison in his cloak and realises he was responsible for King Hamlet's death. When he learns of their secret marriage, Claudius decides to use her to spy on Hamlet. Ophelia warns him of her discovery and he tells her to leave Elsinore for a convent where she'll be safe from Claudius. Polonius deduces that Hamlet is mad, but Claudius isn't convinced and instructs him to have Ophelia married off.
That night, Hamlet enlists a troupe of actors to perform a spectacle that depicts his father's murder. Claudius bursts into a rage, confirming Hamlet's suspicions. Gertrude accuses Ophelia of turning Hamlet against her and dismisses her.

Polonius goes to plead with Gertrude on his daughter's behalf but he is killed by Hamlet who mistook him for Claudius. Ophelia is left further devastated when Horatio tells her that Hamlet has been banished to England along with Rosencrantz and Guildenstern.
Laertes returns from France demanding justice for his father's death. While being prepared for her wedding, Ophelia gets into a fight with one of the queen's ladies who tells her that Claudius ordered Hamlet's murder, but her hopes are suddenly lifted when Horatio tells her that he is still alive. While attempting to escape the castle she is cornered by Claudius. Ophelia calls him out for his mistreatment of Mechtild and he has her locked up, but she escapes and feigns madness. During her act, she tells Horatio to take her body from the grave. Claudius orders her to be arrested but Gertrude shows her mercy, believing her to be truly insane. The guards pursue her to the lake where she drinks Mechtild's poison and seemingly drowns.

Horatio has seen through her request and recovers her body from the grave just as she wakes up, but she is weakened from consuming too much of the poison. While accompanying her through the forest, they come across Norwegian soldiers on their way to Elsinore. Horatio wishes her well before he leaves to warn the court while Ophelia seeks out Mechtild for an antidote.
When confronted about her role in the king's murder, Mechtild explains that while she had no part in it she admits she couldn't deny Claudius as she still harboured feelings for him, but agrees that he should pay for his crimes. While Ophelia rests, Mechtild goes to offer her help to the invading Norwegians. 
Ophelia awakes to find a stunned and remorseful Gertrude, who tells her that Laertes has challenged Hamlet to a duel. Ophelia forgives her, and with Gertrude's help she is able to sneak back into the castle unrecognised. 
Claudius meanwhile has anointed Laertes’ sword with poison.
Hamlet is overjoyed to see his beloved is alive and well. Ophelia pleads with him to leave with her but he is still consumed by the desire for vengeance, and promises he will follow her to the convent. Ophelia sadly bids him goodbye and leaves Elsinore for good. Both Hamlet and Laertes are killed when they are wounded by his poisoned sword.
Enraged and grief-stricken, Gertrude grabs Hamlet's sword and kills Claudius, just as the Norwegians storm the castle, accompanied by Mechtild. Gertrude poisons herself with Claudius' venom and she dies in her sister's arms.
The film closes with Ophelia living peacefully in exile with her daughter fathered by Hamlet.

Cast

Production
On May 4, 2016, it was announced that Daisy Ridley and Naomi Watts would star in the drama film Ophelia based on the novel by Lisa Klein, which was in turn based on the character of same name by William Shakespeare from his play Hamlet. The film would be directed by Claire McCarthy and the script written by Semi Chellas. Covert Media would finance the film, while Daniel Bobker and Ehren Kruger would produce the film along with Sarah Curtis. Bert Marcus also executive produced the film.

Filming began in April 2017, with a first look image released in May. After three months, principal production wrapped on July 6, 2017. Composer Steven Price signed on to write the musical score.

Release
It premiered at the Sundance Film Festival on January 22, 2018. In February 2019, IFC Films acquired the US distribution rights to the film. It was released in theaters on June 28, 2019. Blue Finch Film later acquired the UK distribution rights on August 15, 2019, a month after its US release, and released it on November 22, 2019.

Critical reception
The film received mixed reviews from critics, praising its production design, direction, and acting (mostly that of Ridley and Watts), but criticizing the screenplay. On review aggregator website Rotten Tomatoes, the film holds an approval rating of  based on  reviews. The site's critics consensus reads: "Flawed yet intriguing, Ophelia uses Hamlet as the starting point for a noble attempt to offer a misunderstood character long-overdue agency." Metacritic gave it a score of 60 based on 22 critics, indicating "mixed or average reviews".

Additional reviews cited that the film is "moving, intoxicating, haunting: the most visually pleasurable film so far this year," and that it's "real entertainment", as "Daisy Ridley does first-rate work in the title role." Other publications also praised Ridley citing that "Daisy Ridley may have been born to play these types of roles because Ophelia is strong and powerful, just like Rey," and she gives a "beautiful performance". Rotund Reviews states that they "can’t praise this film enough and highly recommends checking it out." Film Frenzy states that the film "offers an imaginative retelling of an acknowledged masterpiece from an alternate POV" and it's "definitely worth seeing and admiring. Flixist also said that the film is "compelling" and "visually striking" while the "score was one of [his] favourite parts of the film: compelling, forceful, unique." RogerEbert.com praised the film, stating that it demonstrates "courage, intelligence, integrity, and agency." The Wrap agrees that it is a "lush, intelligent adaptation".

References

External links
 

2018 romantic drama films
2018 independent films
American romantic drama films
American films about revenge
British romantic drama films
Films about interclass romance
British films about revenge
Films about royalty
Films based on Hamlet
Films based on American novels
Films based on adaptations
Films based on multiple works
Films scored by Steven Price
Films set in castles
Films set in Denmark
Films set in the Middle Ages
Films shot in the Czech Republic
Films shot in Prague
IFC Films films
2010s English-language films
Films directed by Claire McCarthy
2010s American films
2010s British films